"Wings" is a song by American group Jonas Brothers, released through Republic Records as the lead single from their upcoming sixth studio album, The Album, on February 24, 2023. The three group members, Nick, Joe, and Kevin Jonas, wrote the song with producer Jon Bellion. It received critical acclaim for the production, although some people criticized the short length of the song.

Background
On January 27, 2023, the Jonas Brothers were interviewed by Variety, in which they revealed a few song titles from The Album, with "Wings" being one of them. Two days later, Joe Jonas shared a snippet of the song while being in the company of his brothers Nick and Kevin, announcing that the group had received the final mix of it. After previewing various snippets of the song, they announced its release date and shared its cover art on February 9, 2023.

Credits and personnel
 Nick Jonas – vocals, songwriting
 Joe Jonas – vocals, songwriting
 Kevin Jonas – songwriting, guitar
 Jon Bellion – production, songwriting

Charts

References

2023 singles
2023 songs
Jonas Brothers songs
Songs written by Nick Jonas
Songs written by Joe Jonas
Songs written by Kevin Jonas
Songs written by Jon Bellion
Song recordings produced by Jon Bellion